The SPI 20 is a capitalization-weighted stock index of large-cap companies listed on the SIX Swiss Exchange.

It is made up of the same components as the Swiss Market Index, except that it does not have any cap on the maximum percentage that a component can have. It was created in 2017, after the largest SMI constituents were capped at 18%.

Current constituents

As of September 20, 2021, the following 20 stocks make up the SPI 20 index.

See also
 Swiss Market Index
 Swiss Performance Index

Notes and references

Stock market
Swiss stock market indices